Behavior (American English) or behaviour (British English) is the range of actions and mannerisms made by individuals, organisms, systems or artificial entities in some environment. These systems can include other systems or organisms as well as the inanimate physical environment. It is the computed response of the system or organism to various stimuli or inputs, whether internal or external, conscious or subconscious, overt or covert, and voluntary or involuntary.

Taking a behavior informatics perspective, a behavior consists of actor, operation, interactions, and their properties. This can be represented as a behavior vector.

Models

Biology

Although disagreement exists as to how to precisely define behavior in a biological context, one common interpretation based on a meta-analysis of scientific literature states that "behavior is the internally coordinated responses (actions or inactions) of whole living organisms (individuals or groups) to internal or external stimuli".

A broader definition of behavior, applicable to plants and other organisms, is similar to the concept of phenotypic plasticity. It describes behavior as a response to an event or environment change during the course of the lifetime of an individual, differing from other physiological or biochemical changes that occur more rapidly, and excluding changes that are a result of development (ontogeny).

Behaviors can be either innate or learned from the environment.

Behavior can be regarded as any action of an organism that changes its relationship to its environment. Behavior provides outputs from the organism to the environment.

Human behavior

The endocrine system and the nervous system likely influence human behavior. Complexity in the behavior of an organism may be correlated to the complexity of its nervous system. Generally, organisms with more complex nervous systems have a greater capacity to learn new responses and thus adjust their behavior.

Animal behavior

Ethology is the scientific and objective study of animal behavior, usually with a focus on behavior under natural conditions, and viewing behavior as an evolutionarily adaptive trait. behaviorism is a term that also describes the scientific and objective study of animal behavior, usually referring to measured responses to stimuli or trained behavioral responses in a laboratory context, without a particular emphasis on evolutionary adaptivity.

Consumer behavior

Consumers behavior
Consumer behavior involves the processes consumers go through, and reactions they have towards products or services.  It has to do with consumption, and the processes consumers go through around purchasing and consuming goods and services. Consumers recognise needs or wants, and go through a process to satisfy these needs. Consumer behavior is the process they go through as customers, which includes types of products purchased, amount spent, frequency of purchases and what influences them to make the purchase decision or not.

Circumstances that influence consumer behavior are varied, with contributions from both internal and external factors.  Internal factors include attitudes, needs, motives, preferences and perceptual processes, whilst external factors include marketing activities, social and economic factors, and cultural aspects.  Doctor Lars Perner of the University of Southern California claims that there are also physical factors that influence consumer behavior, for example if a consumer is hungry, then this physical feeling of hunger will influence them so that they go and purchase a sandwich to satisfy the hunger.

Consumer decision making
There is a model described by Lars Perner which illustrates the decision-making process with regards to consumer behavior. It begins with recognition of a problem, the consumer recognises a need or want which has not been satisfied. This leads the consumer to search for information, if it is a low involvement product then the search will be internal, identifying alternatives purely from memory. If the product is high involvement then the search be more thorough, such as reading reviews or reports or asking friends.

The consumer will then evaluate his or her alternatives, comparing price, quality, doing trade-offs between products and narrowing down the choice by eliminating the less appealing products until there is one left. After this has been identified, the consumer will purchase the product.

Finally the consumer will evaluate the purchase decision, and the purchased product, bringing in factors such as value for money, quality of goods and purchase experience. However, this logical process does not always happen this way, people are emotional and irrational creatures. People make decisions with emotion and then justify it with logic according to Robert Caladini Ph.D. Psychology.

How the 4P's influence consumer behavior
The Marketing mix (4 P's) are a marketing tool, and stand for Price, Promotion, Product and Placement.

Because consumer behavior is influenced greatly by business to consumer marketing, the 4 P's will have an effect on consumer's behavior. The price of a good or service is largely determined by the market, as businesses will set their prices to be similar to that of other business so as to remain competitive whilst making a profit.  When market prices for a product are high, it will cause consumers to purchase less and use purchased goods for longer periods of time, meaning they are purchasing the product less often. Alternatively, when market prices for a product are low, consumers are more likely to purchase more of the product, and more often.

The way that promotion influences consumer behavior has changed over time. In the past, large promotional campaigns and heavy advertising would convert into sales for a business, but nowadays businesses can have success on products with little or no advertising. This is due to the Internet, and in particular social media. They rely on word of mouth from consumers using social media, and as products trend online, so sales increase as products effectively promote themselves.  Thus, promotion by businesses does not necessarily result in consumer behavior trending towards purchasing products.

The way that product influences consumer behavior is through consumer willingness to pay, and consumer preferences. This means that even if a company were to have a long history of products in the market, consumers will still pick a cheaper product over the company in question's product if it means they will pay less for something that is very similar. This is due to consumer willingness to pay, or their willingness to part with their money they have earned. Product also influences consumer behavior through customer preferences. For example, take Pepsi vs Coca-Cola, a Pepsi-drinker is less likely to purchase Coca-Cola, even if it is cheaper and more convenient. This is due to the preference of the consumer, and no matter how hard the opposing company tries they will not be able to force the customer to change their mind.

Product placement in the modern era has little influence on consumer behavior, due to the availability of goods online.  If a customer can purchase a good from the comfort of their home instead of purchasing in-store, then the placement of products is not going to influence their purchase decision.

In management

Behavior outside of psychology includes

Organizational

In management, behaviors are associated with desired or undesired focuses. Managers generally note what the desired outcome is, but behavioral patterns can take over. These patterns are the reference to how often the desired behavior actually occurs. Before a behavior actually occurs, antecedents focus on the stimuli that influence the behavior that is about to happen. After the behavior occurs, consequences fall into place. Consequences consist of rewards or punishments.

Social behavior
Social behavior is behavior among two or more organisms within the same species, and encompasses any behavior in which one member affects the other. This is due to an interaction among those members. Social behavior can be seen as similar to an exchange of goods, with the expectation that when one gives, one will receive the same. This behavior can be affected by both the qualities of the individual and the environmental (situational) factors. Therefore, social behavior arises as a result of an interaction between the two—the organism and its environment. This means that, in regards to humans, social behavior can be determined by both the individual characteristics of the person, and the situation they are in.

Behavior informatics 
Behavior informatics also called behavior computing, explores behavior intelligence and behavior insights from the informatics and computing perspectives.

Different from applied behavior analysis from the psychological perspective, BI builds computational theories, systems and tools to qualitatively and quantitatively model, represent, analyze, and manage behaviors of individuals, groups and/or organizations.

Health

Health behavior refers to a person's beliefs and actions regarding their health and well-being. Health behaviors are direct factors in maintaining a healthy lifestyle. Health behaviors are influenced by the social, cultural, and physical environments in which we live. They are shaped by individual choices and external constraints. Positive behaviors help promote health and prevent disease, while the opposite is true for risk behaviors. Health behaviors are early indicators of population health. Because of the time lag that often occurs between certain behaviors and the development of disease, these indicators may foreshadow the future burdens and benefits of health-risk and health-promoting behaviors.

Correlates
A variety of studies have examined the relationship between health behaviors and health outcomes (e.g., Blaxter 1990) and have demonstrated their role in both morbidity and mortality.

These studies have identified seven features of lifestyle which were associated with lower morbidity and higher subsequent long-term survival (Belloc and Breslow 1972):
 Avoiding snacks
 Eating breakfast regularly
 Exercising regularly
 Maintaining a desirable body weight
 Moderate alcohol intake
 Not smoking
 Sleeping 7–8h per night

Health behaviors impact upon individuals' quality of life, by delaying the onset of chronic disease and extending active lifespan. Smoking, alcohol consumption, diet, gaps in primary care services and low screening uptake are all significant determinants of poor health, and changing such behaviors should lead to improved health.
For example, in USA, Healthy People 2000, United States Department of Health and Human Services, lists increased physical activity, changes in nutrition and reductions in tobacco, alcohol and drug use as important for health promotion and disease prevention.

Treatment approach
Any interventions done are matched with the needs of each individual in an ethical and respected manner. Health belief model encourages increasing individuals' perceived susceptibility to negative health outcomes and making individuals aware of the severity of such negative health behavior outcomes. E.g. through health promotion messages. In addition, the health belief model suggests the need to focus on the benefits of health behaviors and the fact that barriers to action are easily overcome. The theory of planned behavior suggests using persuasive messages for tackling behavioral beliefs to increase the readiness to perform a behavior, called intentions. The theory of planned behavior advocates the need to tackle normative beliefs and control beliefs in any attempt to change behavior. Challenging the normative beliefs is not enough but to follow through the intention with self-efficacy from individual's mastery in problem solving and task completion is important to bring about a positive change. Self efficacy is often cemented through standard persuasive techniques.

See also

 Applied behavior analysis
 Behavioral cusp
 Behavioral economics
 Behavioral genetics
 Behavioral sciences
 Cognitive bias
 Evolutionary physiology
 Experimental analysis of behavior
 Human sexual behavior
 Herd behavior
 Instinct
 Mere-measurement effect
 Motivation
 Normality (behavior)
 Organizational studies
 Radical behaviorism
 Reasoning
 Rebellion
 Social relation
 Theories of political behavior
 Work behavior

References

General
 Cao, L. (2014). Behavior Informatics: A New Perspective. IEEE Intelligent Systems (Trends and Controversies), 29(4): 62–80.
 
 
 Perner, L. (2008), Consumer behavior. University of Southern California, Marshall School of Business. Retrieved from http://www.consumerpsychologist.com/intro_Consumer_Behavior.html

Further reading
 Bateson, P. (2017) behavior, Development and Evolution. Open Book Publishers, Cambridge. .

External links

 What is behavior? Baby don't ask me, don't ask me, no more at Earthling Nature.
 www.behaviorinformatics.org
 Links to review articles by Eric Turkheimer and co-authors on behavior research
 Links to IJCAI2013 tutorial on behavior informatics and computing